Mycologia is a peer-reviewed scientific journal that publishes papers on all aspects of the fungi, including lichens. It first appeared as a bimonthly journal in January 1909, published by the New York Botanical Garden under the editorship of William Murrill. It became the official journal of the Mycological Society of America, which still publishes it today. It was formed as a merger of the Journal of Mycology (14 volumes; 1885–1908) and the Mycological Bulletin (7 volumes; 1903–1908). The Mycological Bulletin was known as the Ohio Mycological Bulletin in its first volume.

Editors
The following persons have been editor-in-chief of the journal:

The following persons have been managing editor of the journal:

Abstracting and indexing
Mycologia is abstracted and indexing in the following databases:

References

External links

 
 Out of copyright scans of volumes 1-41

Mycology journals
English-language journals
Publications established in 1909
Bimonthly journals
1909 establishments in the United States
Taylor & Francis academic journals